Glendale is a suburb of Lake Macquarie, Greater Newcastle, New South Wales, Australia, located  west of Newcastle's central business district at the northern tip of the City of Lake Macquarie local government area.

Name
The name is Scottish in origin – "glen" (gleann) is a Scottish term for a valley between hills, and "dale", also usually meaning a valley.

Transport
Relative to other areas in Greater Newcastle, Glendale is well serviced by public transport and is adjacent to, but not directly connected to, the Cardiff industrial estate, which is the largest industrial estate in the Lower Hunter region. The railway line presently separates the industrial estate from Glendale.
The suburb is home to the proposed Lake Macquarie Transport Interchange, which is partly currently under construction.

Education
 Major campus of Hunter TAFE
Glendale Technology High School
Glendale East Public School
Holy Cross Primary School

History 
The Aboriginal people, in this area, the Awabakal, were the first people of this land.

Commercial area 
The commercial area of Glendale is situated along Lake Road and Main Road featuring fast food outlets, petrol stations, and numerous shops. Stockland Glendale is a shopping centre just off Lake Road.

References

External links
 History of Glendale (Lake Macquarie City Library)
Historical photographs
 Lower Hunter Regional Strategy

Suburbs of Lake Macquarie